Soku-hi means "is and is not". The term is primarily used by the representatives of the Kyoto School of Eastern philosophy.

The logic of soku-hi or "is and is not" represents a balanced logic of symbolization reflecting sensitivity to the mutual determination of universality and particularity in nature, and a corresponding emphasis on nonattachment to linguistic predicates and subjects as representations of the real.

See also

Emptiness, a concept in Kyoto School philosophy
Nishida Kitaro

Notes

References and external links
Logic of soku-hi by D.T. Suzuki (poetry)
Rude awakenings: Zen, the Kyoto school, & the question of nationalism, by James W. Heisig & John C. Maraldo. p. 24.
'The Kyoto School' on the Stanford Encyclopedia of Philosophy

Japanese philosophy
Logic